Thymus herba-barona is a species of thyme native to Corsica, Sardinia, and Majorca. It is also sometimes known by the common name caraway thyme, as it has a strong scent similar to caraway, for which it can be used as a substitute in any recipe. It can be used in cuisine or as an evergreen ground cover plant for the garden.

There are two subspecies:
Thymus herba-barona subsp. herba-barona. Corsica, Sardinia
Thymus herba-barona subsp. bivalens. Majorca (Spain)

Description
The foliage has a strong aroma of caraway. The flowers are pink with four petals and a prominent lower lip. They are produced in late spring and early summer, and are attractive to bees and butterflies.

Cultivation and uses
Caraway thyme grows best in average soil with light watering and full sunlight. The plant was favoured in England as a seasoning for barons of beef; this inspired its scientific name. It is cultivated in gardens across the world. Caraway thyme is difficult to grow from seed, so it is usually purchased as young plants 5–10 cm high, in small pots.

Caraway thyme contains an essential oil and the plant has antiseptic, deodorant and disinfectant uses. It also has uses in perfumery, as a mouth wash and as a traditional medicine. A study undertaken to compare the essential oil with similar oils from two other members of the genus found that all three had similar antimicrobial activities against gram-positive bacteria and against mycetes as compared to the well known antiseptic chlorhexidine gluconate.

References

Flora Europaea: Thymus herba-barona
Demography, population structure and dynamics of Thymus herba-barona subsp. bivalens (Lamiaceae) (pdf file)

herba-barona
Flora of Corsica
Flora of Sardinia
Flora of the Balearic Islands
Herbs